David Anthony Aspin (born 24 June 1950) is a wrestler from Waiuku, New Zealand. He competed in the freestyle wrestling discipline, where he was the 1974 Commonwealth Games champion and 1970 Commonwealth Games bronze medalist, in the middleweight category. He was also New Zealand's flag bearer at the opening ceremonies of the 1972 Summer Olympics, in Munich, and at the 1976 Summer Olympics in Montreal. Aspin and Arthur Porritt are the only New Zealand Olympians to have carried the flag at two different Olympics.

References

Living people
Commonwealth Games gold medallists for New Zealand
Commonwealth Games bronze medallists for New Zealand
Wrestlers at the 1970 British Commonwealth Games
Wrestlers at the 1972 Summer Olympics
Wrestlers at the 1974 British Commonwealth Games
Wrestlers at the 1976 Summer Olympics
New Zealand male sport wrestlers
Olympic wrestlers of New Zealand
1950 births
People from Waiuku
Commonwealth Games medallists in wrestling
20th-century New Zealand people
21st-century New Zealand people
People educated at St Paul's College, Auckland
Medallists at the 1970 British Commonwealth Games